The Gulf Stream Hotel is a historic hotel in Lake Worth Beach, Florida. It is located at 1 Lake Avenue. On January 11, 1983, it was added to the U.S. National Register of Historic Places.
 
Originally built in 1923, the hotel was mostly owned by the families of Gen. Richard C Marshall and Col. H.Cabel Maddox.  From 1941 to 1971, it was managed by Ben Pease.  After Pease retired, William R. Donnell, along with his wife Ellen, son Rick, and daughters Beth and Carol ran the operations until 1992.

A book was written about the classic hotel in 1976 titled "The Gulfstream Hotel Story" by Glenn Ingram.  Ingram was a career CPA from Chicago who spent many winters at The Gulfstream with his wife Nelle.

Ceebraid-Signal Corp Lake Worth purchased the hotel in 2005 for $12.9 million. It was the target of a foreclosure lawsuit.

References

External links

 Palm Beach County listings at National Register of Historic Places
 Florida's Office of Cultural and Historical Programs
 Palm Beach County listings
 Gulf Stream Hotel

Buildings and structures in Lake Worth Beach, Florida
National Register of Historic Places in Palm Beach County, Florida
Hotels in Palm Beach County, Florida
1923 establishments in Florida